The National Education Association (NEA) is the largest labor union in the United States. It represents public school teachers and other support personnel, faculty and staffers at colleges and universities, retired educators, and college students preparing to become teachers. The NEA has just under 3 million members and is headquartered in Washington, D.C. The NEA had a budget of more than $341 million for the 2012–2013 fiscal year. Becky Pringle is the NEA's current president.

Per the NEA website: "Our mission is to advocate for education professionals and to unite our members and the nation to fulfill the promise of public education to prepare every student to succeed in a diverse and interdependent world."

During the early 20th century, the National Education Association was among the leading progressive advocates of establishing a United States Department of Education. 
The NEA, by the 1970s emerged as a factor in modern American liberalism. 
State affiliates of the NEA regularly lobby state legislators for funding, seek to influence education policy, and file legal actions.

Structure and governance
The NEA has a membership of just under 3 million people, with membership levels dropping every year since 2010. The NEA is incorporated as a professional association in a few states and as a Trade union in most. The group holds a congressional charter under Title 36 of the United States Code. It is not a member of the AFL–CIO, but is part of Education International, the global federation of teachers' unions.

NEA members set the union's policies through the Representative Assembly (RA). The RA, which is a delegation comprising elected representatives from each local and state affiliate, coalitions of student members and retired members, and other segments of the united education profession—is the primary legislative and policy-making body of the NEA.

, the executive officers of the NEA are Rebecca Pringle (President), Princess Moss (Vice President), Noel Candelaria (Secretary-Treasurer) and Kim A. Anderson (Executive Director). These posts are elected by the Representative Assembly.

The board of directors and executive committee are responsible for the general policies and interests of the NEA. The board of directors consists of one director from each state affiliate (plus an additional director for every 20,000 active members in the state), six directors for the retired members, and three directors for the student members. The board also includes at-large representatives of ethnic minorities, administrators, classroom teachers in higher education, and active members employed in educational support positions.

History

Founding
The NEA was founded in Philadelphia in 1857 as the National Teachers Association (NTA). Zalmon Richards was elected the NTA's first president and presided over the organization's first annual meeting in 1858. The NTA became the National Education Association (NEA) in 1870 when it merged with the American Normal School Association, the National Association of School Superintendents, and the Central College Association. The union was chartered by Congress in 1906.

Mergers
NEA officially merged with the American Teachers Association, the historically black teachers association founded as the National Association of Teachers in Colored Schools, in 1966.

In 1998, a tentative merger agreement was reached between NEA and American Federation of Teachers (AFT) negotiators, but ratification failed soundly in the NEA's Representative Assembly meeting in New Orleans in early July 1998.

However, five NEA state affiliates have merged with their AFT counterparts. Mergers occurred in Florida (the Florida Education Association formed in 2000); Minnesota (Education Minnesota formed in 1998), Montana (MEA-MFT formed in 2000), New York (New York State United Teachers formed in 2006) and North Dakota. North Dakota United formed in 2013.

Membership trends

Before the 1960s, only a small portion of public school teachers were unionized. That began to change in 1959, when Wisconsin became the first state to pass a collective bargaining law for public employees. Over the next 20 years, most other states adopted similar laws. The NEA reported a membership of 766,000 in 1961.

In the 1960s, the NEA's demographics were changing. This was due to the merger with ATA and the decision to become a true labor union, among other factors. In 1967, the NEA elected its first Hispanic president, Braulio Alonso. In 1968, NEA elected its first black president, Elizabeth Duncan Koontz.

In 2006, the NEA and the AFL–CIO also announced that, for the first time, stand-alone NEA locals as well as those that had merged with the AFT would be allowed to join state and local labor federations affiliated with the AFL-CIO.

In 2007, at the 150th anniversary of its founding, NEA membership had grown to 3.2 million. However, by July 2012, USA Today reported that NEA had lost nearly 0.3% of their members each year since 2010.

Following the Supreme Court's 2018 Janus v. AFSCME case, which ended the compulsion of non-union, public employees to pay agency fees, or what are colloquially known as 'fair-share fees,' the NEA's total membership and agency fee payers dropped from 3,074,841 on its November 28, 2017, report to 2,975,933 in its August 31, 2019, report, a total loss of 98,908 dues payers.

Notable members
C. Louise Boehringer, in 1913 she spoke at their convention in San Francisco
Della Prell Darknell Campbell
William George Carr, Executive Director of the NEA from 1952 to 1967
Sabra R. Greenhalgh, life member of the NEA, elected a delegate to represent northern California at the annual convention in Columbus, Ohio, in 1931
Kate Wetzel Jameson, member
Vesta C. Muehleisen, member
Caroline Haven Ober, member
Jill Biden, First Lady of the United States
Waurine Walker, president (1954–1955)
Pearl Anderson Wanamaker, president (1946–1947)
Caroline S. Woodruff, president (1937–1938)
Mary Yost, vice-president of the Western Division of Department of Deans of Women

Composition
For most of the 20th century, the NEA represented the public school administration in small towns and rural areas. The state organizations played a major role in policy formation for the NEA. After 1957, the NEA reoriented itself to primarily represent the teachers in those districts, rather than just the administrators. It came to resemble the rival American Federation of Teachers (AFT), which was a labor union for teachers in larger cities. The success of the AFT in raising wages through strike activity encouraged the NEA to undertake similar activities. In the 1970s, more militant politics came to characterize the NEA. It created the NEA Political Action Committee to engage in local election campaigns, and it began endorsing political candidates who supported its policy goals. State NEA branches became less important as the national and local levels began direct and unmediated relationships. The NEA's elected leadership often supported teachers in opposition to school administrators.

According to NEA's Department of Labor records since 2005, when membership classifications were first reported, the majority of the union's membership are "active professional" members, having fallen only slightly from 74% to the current 71%. The second largest category have been "active education support professional" members, with about 15%. The third largest category are "retired" members, which have grown from 8% to 10%. Two other categories, "active life" and "student" members, have both remained with around 2%, falling slightly. These categories are eligible to vote in the union, though the union lists some comparatively marginal categories which are not eligible to vote: "staff", "substitute" and "reserve" members, each with less than 1% of the union's membership. NEA contracts also cover some non-members, known as agency fee payers, which since 2006 have numbered comparatively about 3% of the size of the union's membership.

As of 2014 these categories account for about: 2.1 million "active professionals", 457,000 "active education support professionals", 300,000 "retirees", 52,000 "students", 42,000 "active life" members, and just under nine thousand others, plus about 90,000 non-members paying agency fees.

Funding
Most NEA funding comes from dues paid by its members ($295 million in dues from a $341 million total budget in 2005). Typically, local chapters negotiate a contract with automatic deduction of dues from members' paychecks. Part of the dues remain with the local affiliate (the district association), a portion goes to the state association, and a portion is given to the national association. The NEA returned 39 percent of dues money back to state affiliates in 2021 and 2022.

Federal law prohibits unions from using dues money or other assets to contribute to or otherwise assist federal candidates or political parties, in accordance with their tax-exempt status. The NEA Fund for Children and Public Education is a special fund for voluntary contributions from NEA members which can legally be used to assist candidates and political parties. Critics have repeatedly questioned the NEA's actual compliance with such laws, and a number of legal actions focusing on the union's use of money and union personnel in partisan contexts have ensued.

Read Across America Day 

National Read Across America Day is an NEA initiative to encourage reading. It has expanded into a year-long program with special celebrations in March as National Reading Month. Read Across America Day began in 1998, on March 2 which was the birthday of the popular children's author, Dr. Seuss. The NEA partnered with Dr. Seuss Enterprises on the venture from 1997 to 2018, when the contract ended. Since 2017, NEA's Read Across America focuses on the importance, value, and fun of reading and sharing diverse books and "celebrating a nation of diverse readers."

Policy positions
The NEA has taken positions on policy issues including:
 "Cardinal Principles of Secondary Education", a report by the NEA in 1918. They emphasized the education of students in terms of health, a command of fundamental processes, worthy home membership, vocation, citizenship, worthy use of leisure, and ethical character. They emphasized life adjustment and reflected the social efficiency model of progressive education.
 The "Preliminary Report on the Tenure of Teachers" appeared in 1920, cautiously recommending school boards adopt a policy of tenure.
 From 1923–1928,  Hunter's "Committee of One Hundred on the Problem of Tenure" stressed the  advantages of tenure for society. In 1925, it argued that tenure "protects the great body of good teachers from political attack and from dismissal for petty personal and political reasons", but also argued that administrators should maintain control over dismissal decisions.
 Reforming the No Child Left Behind Act to reduce the focus on standardized testing
 Increasing education funding
 A minimum $40,000 starting annual salary for all teachers
 Mandate high school graduation or equivalency as compulsory for everyone below the age of 21
 Lowering the achievement gap
 Reforming Social Security Offsets (GPO/WEP)
 Discouraging school vouchers and all forms of competition with public schools
 Reforming laws governing charter schools

In 2020, the union along with the American Federation of Teachers issued a report expressing opposition to active shooter drills being held in schools, calling on the drills to be revised or eliminated.

Political activities

NEA has played a role in politics since its founding, as it has sought to influence state and federal laws that would affect public education. The extent to which the NEA and its state and local affiliates engage in political activities, especially during election cycles, has been a source of controversy.

The organization tracks legislation related to education and the teaching profession and encourages members to get involved in politics.

 1910–1915: Women play increasing leadership roles in NEA.
 1912: NEA endorses women's suffrage in the United States
 1918: NEA "Commission on the Emergency in Education", with George Strayer as chairman, Warns that the evidence from the wartime draft shows millions of potential soldiers were illiterate or poorly educated, and often in bad health. The NEA study said the cause was very low quality rural schools in the South, badly trained teachers, and inequitable financing. It called for $100 million of federal aid to remedy the deficiencies, but none was forthcoming.  Many states, however, started setting minimal standards for rural schools.
 1923: NEA starts to promote state pension plans for teachers; by 1950, every state had a pension plan in effect.
 1920s: The main NEA goal during this period was to raise teacher salaries, raise standards, and to gain a cabinet-level U.S. Secretary of Education. Success on the cabinet issue came in 1979.
 1930s: The NEA was never on good terms with the New Deal. Its main goal was for Congress to pass a multipurpose public finance bill that would supplement local property taxes in funding public schools. Some relief money was used to build schools, but the New Deal avoided channeling any of it through the Office of Education. Legislation never succeeded, because it would condone segregated schools in the South and because Roosevelt rejected any across-the-board program. He believed that federal money should only go to the poorest schools, and none to rich states. The New Deal set up its own separate educational program through the Civilian Conservation Corps and other relief agencies.
 1940s: NEA successfully lobbied Congress for special funding for public schools near military bases.
 1944: NEA lobbied for the G.I. Bill, a law that provided a range of benefits for returning World War II veterans.
 1958: NEA helps gain passage of the National Defense Education Act
 1964: NEA lobbies to pass the Civil Rights Act
 1965: NEA works with Catholic school leaders to pass the Elementary and Secondary Education Act for federal aid to schools.
 1968: After years of feuding, the AFT suggests a merger with the NEA. The NEA refuses.
 1968: NEA lobbies for passage of the Bilingual Education Act, with federal funding for Spanish-language education in public schools.
 1968-68. Wave of school strikes outside South; 80% by NEA.
 1969: 450,000 teachers covered by 1,019 collective bargaining agreements. NEA accounted for 90 percent of the contracts and 61 percent of the teachers.
 1972: New York State Teachers Association quits the NEA and merges with the AFT.
 1970s: State affiliates become powerful lobbyists.
 1976: 265 NEA delegates attend the Democratic National Convention; NEA endorses Democrat Jimmy Carter for president; he wins and secures a Department of Education in 1979.
 1980: 464 NEA delegates attend the Democratic National Convention.
 1984: NEA lobbies for passage of a federal retirement equity law that provides the means to end sex discrimination against women in retirement funds.
 2000–present: NEA lobbies for changes to the No Child Left Behind Act
 2009: NEA delegates to the Representative Assembly pass a resolution that opposes discriminatory treatment of same-sex couples.

In recent decades the NEA has increased its visibility in party politics, endorsing more Democratic Party candidates and contributing funds and other assistance to political campaigns. The NEA asserts itself as "non-partisan", but critics point out that the NEA has endorsed and provided support for every Democratic presidential nominee from Jimmy Carter to Barack Obama and has never endorsed any Republican or third party candidate for the presidency.

Based on required filings with the federal government, it is estimated that between 1990 and 2002, eighty percent of the NEA's substantial political contributions went to Democratic Party candidates and ninety five percent of contributions went to Democrats in 2012. the NEA maintains that it bases support for candidates primarily on the organization's interpretation of candidates' support for public education and educators. Every presidential candidate endorsed by the NEA must be recommended by the NEA's PAC Council (composed of representatives from every state and caucus) and approved by the Board of Directors by a 58 percent majority. In October 2015, the NEA endorsed Hillary Clinton's 2016 presidential bid. Clinton accepted the endorsement in person.

The NEA is a member of the U.S. Global Leadership Coalition.

Legislation opposed and supported
In September 2013, the NEA wrote an open letter to the United States House of Representatives opposing the Continuing Appropriations Resolution, 2014 (H.J.Res 59; 113th Congress). The NEA urged representatives to vote no because the bill "continues the devastating cuts to education set in motion by the sequester and permanently defunds the Affordable Care Act." The organization stated that they may decide to use the vote on this bill in their NEA Legislative Report Card for the 113th Congress.

Criticism
Some critics have alleged the NEA puts the interests of teachers ahead of students. The NEA has often opposed measures such as merit pay, school vouchers, weakening of teacher tenure, certain curricular changes, the No Child Left Behind Act, and other reforms that make it easier for school districts to use disciplinary action against teachers. In July 2019, the NEA voted down a resolution that would have "re-dedicate[d] itself to the pursuit of increased student learning in every public school in America by putting a renewed emphasis on quality education."

With the modern scrutiny placed on teacher misconduct, particularly regarding sexual abuse, the NEA has been criticized for its alleged failure to crack down on abusive teachers. From an Associated Press investigation, former NEA President Reg Weaver commented, "Students must be protected from sexual predators and abuse, and teachers must be protected from false accusations." He then refused to be interviewed. The Associated Press reported that much of the resistance to report the problem comes from "where fellow teachers look away", and "school administrators make behind-the-scenes deals".

Inclusion of the "NEA Ex-Gay Caucus" at a convention in 2006 sparked controversy. Some critics believe the NEA promotes a gay rights agenda, especially since the U.S. Ninth Circuit Court of Appeals 2005 case Fields v. Palmdale School District. The case originated when some California elementary school students were administered a school survey containing sexual questions. Parents, who had not been told the survey would contain questions of a sexual nature, brought the case forward. The court in that case initially ruled that parents' fundamental right to control the upbringing of their children "does not extend beyond the threshold of the school door", which upon petition for rehearing was struck and clarified to "does not entitle individual parents to enjoin school boards from providing information the boards determine to be appropriate in connection with the performance of their educational functions," and that a public school has the right to provide its students with "whatever information it wishes to provide, sexual or otherwise." NEA states that it does not "encourage schools to teach students to become gay, lesbian, bisexual, or transgendered (LGBT)", but the NEA does believe that "schools should be safe for all students and advocates that schools should raise awareness of homophobia and intervene when LGBT students are harassed."

A leading critic of NEA from the left is Dr. Rich Gibson, whose article on the NEA–AFT merger convention outlines a critique of unionism itself.

References

External links

 

 National Education Assn influence profile from Influence Explorer by the Sunlight Foundation
 "National Education Association". Infoplease. Based on Columbia Electronic Encyclopedia, 6th ed., 2007.
  by Landmark Legal Foundation
 One Hat for Labor? by David Moberg, The Nation, April 29, 2009

 
Professional associations based in the United States
Trade unions in the United States
Education trade unions
Trade unions established in 1857
Education International
Teacher associations based in the United States
Patriotic and national organizations chartered by the United States Congress
1857 establishments in Pennsylvania
Educational organizations based in Washington, D.C.